The 2019–20 Everton F.C. season was the club's third consecutive campaign in the FA Women's Super League, the highest level of the football pyramid, having been promoted at the end of the 2017 Spring Series. Along with competing in the WSL, the club also contested two domestic cup competitions: the FA Cup and the League Cup.

Ahead of the 2019–20 season, the team dropped Ladies from their name. Although now simply called Everton whenever possible, the club uses Everton Women in a formal capacity when necessary to avoid confusion with the men's team.

On 13 March 2020, in line with the FA's response to the coronavirus pandemic, it was announced the season was temporarily suspended until at least 3 April 2020. After further postponements, the season was ultimately ended prematurely on 25 May 2020 with immediate effect. Everton sat in 7th at the time but moved ahead of Tottenham Hotspur into 6th on sporting merit after The FA Board's decision to award places on a points-per-game basis.

Squad

Pre-season

FA Women's Super League 

Everton planned to only play their opening two home games at Haig Avenue in Southport before moving to their new Walton Hall Park site in time for their third home game, scheduled for 27 October 2019 against Brighton & Hove Albion. However, delays meant the move was postponed until February 2020. The Merseyside derby was also moved to Goodison Park, originally scheduled for 9 February although the game rearranged to March because of Storm Ciara.

Results summary

Results by matchday

Results

League table

Women's FA Cup 

As a member of the top two tiers, Everton entered the FA Cup in the fourth round, beating Championship side London Bees in their opening fixture. On 24 July 2020 it was announced the 2019–20 FA Cup would resume play during the 2020–21 season starting with the quarter-final ties rescheduled for the weekend of 26/27 September 2020. Everton reached the final for the first time since 2014.

FA Women's League Cup

Group stage

Squad statistics

Appearances 

Starting appearances are listed first, followed by substitute appearances after the + symbol where applicable.

|-
|colspan="14"|Joined during 2020–21 season but competed in the postponed 2019–20 FA Cup:

|-
|colspan="14"|Players away from the club on loan:

|-
|colspan="14"|Players who appeared for Everton but left during the season:

|}

Goalscorers

Transfers

Transfers in

Loans in

Transfers out

Loans out

References 

Everton F.C. (women) seasons
Everton